Allison McAtee (born September 24, 1985) is an American actress and producer. She played Catherine Stark in the independent film Bloomington and as Maggie Day in the primetime drama The Haves and the Have Nots.

Early life and education
McAtee was born in Erie, Pennsylvania. She grew up in Edinboro, Pennsylvania.

McAtee studied theatre at the University of Pittsburgh's Dietrich School of Arts and Sciences,  Imperial College London, and Carnegie Mellon University's College of Fine Arts. She holds a BA degree in theater arts from the University of Pittsburgh.

Career

Television
McAtee began her career appearing in stage productions Off-Broadway in New York City. She made her television debut on Rescue Me   followed by Hope and Faith in 2005. She later guest-starred on Ugly Betty, Law & Order: Criminal Intent, CSI: Crime Scene Investigation, its spin-offs CSI: Miami and CSI: NY, and Castle, The Mentalist, NCIS, and Revenge. McAtee was also a recurring guest star for two seasons on Showtime's Californication.

In 2014, McAtee joined the cast of the Oprah Winfrey Network primetime drama, The Haves and the Have Nots. She plays Maggie Day, campaign manager to Jim Cryer (John Schneider) and David Harrington (Peter Parros). She was promoted to regular cast member as of third season.

In June 2021, McAtee was reunited with Bloomington co-star Sarah Stouffer when she guest starred in two episodes of the web series Grey Area. The pair's shared scenes made tongue-in-cheek references to Bloomington.

Films
In film, McAtee has appeared in The Killing Floor (2007) and Hell Ride (2008), and Iron Man (2008) before landing the leading role in the independent drama Bloomington (2010).

Filmography

Films

Television

Stage

Philanthropy
Allison McAtee supports Art of Elysium, Young Storytellers and Love146.

References

External links
 
 
 Allison McAtee at rottentomatoes.com

1979 births
Living people
People from Erie County, Pennsylvania
American people of Irish descent
American people of English descent
American people of German descent
American people of Slovak descent
Female models from Erie, Pennsylvania
University of Pittsburgh alumni
Alumni of Imperial College London
Carnegie Mellon University College of Fine Arts alumni
20th-century American actresses
21st-century American actresses
Actresses from Pennsylvania
American stage actresses
American television actresses
American soap opera actresses
American film actresses